Mary Butler may refer to:

 Lady Mary Butler (1689–1713), second daughter of the 2nd Duke of Ormonde
 Mary E.L. Butler (1874–1920), Irish writer and Irish-language activist
 Mary Joseph Butler (1641–1723), Irish abbess
 Mary Butler (politician) (born 1963), Irish politician
 Mary Anne Butler, Australian playwright
 Mary Hawkins Butler (born 1953), mayor of Madison, Mississippi
 Mary Butler, Duchess of Ormonde (1664–1733)
Mary Butler Lewis, (1903–1970), American anthropologist and archeologist